Tailak Khan, better known as Tailak Batyr - Khan of the Northern Kyrgyz in 1830-1838. He fought for the independence of the Kyrgyz people from the Qing dynasty and the Khanate of Kokand.

Life
Tailak was born in 1796 in the area of Ak-Talaa, modern Kyrgyzstan. Tailak studied martial arts from childhood and grew up as an exemplary warrior. 

In the region of 1810-1820s, the Kazakhs who roamed near Taraz, who were part of the Khanate of Kokand, began to claim Kyrgyz territories. The leader of the Kazakhs, Edine, reached Suusamyr, but was defeated by Tailak Batyr,

Tailak also supported Jahangir Khoja in the uprisings against the Qing dynasty. Kyrgyz troops actively participated in the fighting in 1820, 1821-1822, 1826-1827, 1830. 

In 1820, the Qing detachment, whose number, according to various sources, varies from 500 to 7,000 soldiers, invaded the Kyrgyz territories and attacked Tailak's native pastures. Tailak, having gathered his detachment, began to pursue the Qing army and eventually drove them into the gorge, as a result, the entire army was killed, and the Qing general Bayan Batu committed suicide. 

In the 1820s, the Kyrgyz-Kokand war began, which lasted over 10 years. As a result of this war, the Tian Shan Kyrgyz were subjugated by the Khanate of Kokand, but not for long. In addition, the power of the Kokand Khans was not strong in the conquered territories; among the highest state officials, the majority of places were occupied by the Kyrgyz.

In 1830, it became known that the Qing dynasty was organizing a new campaign against the Kyrgyz, but Tailak Batyr quickly reacted and gathered an impressive force. Emperor Daoguang bestowed on him the title of «Border Lightning» and refused the campaign. 

In 1830 the Kyrgyz, led by Tailak Batyr, were able to stop the large forces of the Kokand Khans. The 7,000-strong army sent by the Khanate of Kokand could not break into the lands of the Tian Shan Kyrgyz. 

In 1832 Tailak Batyr led the resistance to the Khanate of Kokand. He captured the Kurtka fortress and freed all the prisoners, returning their property to them. Kokand Khan Muhammad Ali sent an army of 500 best warriors led by Arap Baghatur, a battle took place in the Jailoo-Bychan area, where a small detachment of Tailak won, and Tailak himself personally killed the enemy commander. 

Having convened a Kurultai, Tailak was proclaimed the Kyrgyz Khan for his military achievements and personal qualities. However, in 1838 he was mortally poisoned through a Kokand spy sent to him.

Legacy
 On July 30, 2016, a solemn event was held in honor of the 220th anniversary of Tailak Batyr in the Naryn region.
 On October 2, 2015, a monument to Tailak Batyr was opened in the village of Baetov, Ak-Talaa District, Naryn Region.
In 2016, the Tailak Batyr mausoleum was reconstructed.

See also
Kyrgyz Khanate
Tagai Biy
Mamatkul Biy 
Atake Biy

References

Sources

Draft History of Qing, Zhao Erxun, 1928
 Kyrgyzs and Uyghurs between the Great States (1760-1881), 2020.

1796 births
1838 deaths
People from Naryn Region
19th-century monarchs in Asia
Muslim monarchs
Khans
Military leaders
19th-century Kyrgyzstani people
History of Kyrgyzstan
Turkic rulers